Douglas James Scalapino (born December 10, 1933 San Francisco, California) is an American physicist noted for his contribution to theoretical condensed matter physics.

Career 
Scalapino completed his undergraduate degree at Yale in 1955, and his PhD at Stanford in 1961. He then followed Ed Jaynes to become a research associate at Washington University in St. Louis from 1961-1962 and then moved to University of Pennsylvania where he attained the rank of full professor in 1969. He is currently a Research Professor of Physics at the University of California, Santa Barbara.

In 1991 he became a member of the National Academy of Sciences and in 1992 he became a fellow of the American Academy of Arts and Sciences. In 1998, he received the Julius Edgar Lilienfeld Prize. In 2013, he and Patrick Lee received the Eugene Feenberg Medal.

References

External links
 Academic Tree entry
 

1933 births
Living people
21st-century American physicists
Washington University physicists
Fellows of the American Physical Society
Yale College alumni
Stanford University alumni
Washington University in St. Louis faculty
University of Pennsylvania faculty
University of California, Santa Barbara faculty